Eliza Amy Hodgson ( Campbell, 10 October 1888 – 7 January 1983) was a New Zealand botanist who specialised in liverworts.

Early life
Hodgson was born in Havelock North and attended Pukahu Primary School and Napier Girls' High School. She went by her middle name Amy. Hodgson was self-educated in botany as her father refused to allow her to attend university.

Botany work

Hodgson collected numerous specimens and was encouraged by George Osborne King Sainsbury with whom she collected. Hodgson also collected with Kenneth Willway Allison. Hodgson published her first scientific paper at the age of 42 and went on to publish more than 30 papers thereafter. She described two new species of liverworts and nine new genera. The liverwort Lejeunea hodgsoniana was named in her honour as was the species Lepidolaena hodgsoniae.

Her herbarium was donated to Massey University in 1972.

Recognition 
She was elected a Fellow of the Linnean Society of London and in 1961 was accorded the same honour by the Royal Society of New Zealand. Hodgson was also an honorary member of the British Bryological Society.

Hodgson was awarded an honorary doctorate by Massey University in 1976.

In 2017, Hodges was selected as one of the Royal Society Te Apārangi's "150 women in 150 words", celebrating the contributions of women to knowledge in New Zealand.

References

1888 births
1983 deaths
20th-century New Zealand botanists
Fellows of the Royal Society of New Zealand
20th-century New Zealand women scientists
Massey University alumni
Members of the British Bryological Society
New Zealand women botanists
People educated at Napier Girls' High School
People from Havelock North